Super Lemonade Factory is a puzzle-platform video game developed by Initials Command.

Gameplay 
Super Lemonade Factory is a puzzle-platform game where players assume the role of two player characters after World War II, Andre and Liselot. Andre's father offers the soft drink factory to his son after he and his wife, Liselot, make a tour of the entire factory. Liselot can perform a double jump, push crates, and talk to other characters; Andre can smash bigger crates and carry Liselot. The player will need to play as both characters to finish the levels. A level editor based on the Ogmo Editor was included in desktop versions.

Development and release 
The game was originally announced for iOS on March 1, 2012; and it was released on March 14 of the same year. On July 9, 2012, the game was released for Microsoft Windows and Mac OS X via IndieVania. It was released on Steam on July 9, 2014 after successfully getting Greenlit by the community. The game was released for Ouya on November 29, 2013.

Reception 

Super Lemonade Factory received "mixed" reviews according to the review aggregation website Metacritic.

AppSpy, TouchArcade and 148Apps rated it 4/5. Slide To Play gave it a 3/4.

Pocket Gamer rated it 3.5/5. Gamezebo rated it 3/5.

Legacy 
A sequel, Super Lemonade Factory Part Two, was released for iOS on November 12, 2013; and for Microsoft Windows, OS X and Ouya on May 17, 2014. A free demake titled Super Lemonade Factory 1989 was released for Microsoft Windows and Ouya in 2014.

On July 27, 2012, Shane Brouwer uploaded the source code to the iOS and AIR versions of the game under the MIT License (same license as Flixel) on GitHub. The assets are included in the repositories, but aren't under a free license. The game was released as freeware on itch.io on February 2, 2021. The entire source code repository (source code and art assets) for the Ouya version was released under the GPL-3.0-only license on GitHub on February 4, 2021 to support the efforts for the preservation of Ouya games.

References

External links 
  (via Internet Archive)
 
 
 
 

2012 video games
Commercial video games with freely available source code
Cooperative video games
iOS games
Formerly proprietary software
macOS games
Open-source video games
Ouya games
Puzzle-platform games
Side-scrolling platform games
Software using the GPL license
Software using the MIT license
Steam Greenlight games
Video games developed in Australia
Video games featuring female protagonists
Video games with user-generated gameplay content
Windows games
World War II video games